Dallin Malmgren (born April 5, 1949) is an American author and retired high school teacher who has written over ten novels and several screenplays.

References

External links
Official Website

Living people
1949 births
20th-century American novelists
21st-century American novelists
American male novelists
20th-century American male writers
21st-century American male writers